William Clifford Heilman (September 27, 1877 – December 20, 1946) was an American composer. Born in Williamsport, Pennsylvania, where he also later died, he composed a number of orchestral works as well as a good deal of chamber music; he also produced songs. Heilman was a graduate of Harvard University, where he later taught for some time.

References

External links

1877 births
1946 deaths
20th-century American composers
20th-century American male musicians
20th-century classical composers
American classical composers
American male classical composers
Classical musicians from Pennsylvania
Harvard University alumni
Harvard University faculty
People from Williamsport, Pennsylvania